The Fila Fresh Crew was a hip-hop group from Dallas, Texas consisting of Fresh K, Dr. Rock and The D.O.C. (known then as Doc-T).

History
Dr. Rock's association with Dr. Dre during his stint as a DJ for the World Class Wreckin' Cru helped land the Fila Fresh Crew a spot on the N.W.A and the Posse compilation album in 1987. A year later, the trio released the EP Tuffest Man Alive which was promoted with three singles.

Doc-T left the group and changed his name to The D.O.C., becoming a valuable contributor to Eazy-E's debut album and newly formed gangsta rap group N.W.A. Acting as a writer to many tracks with Ruthless Records (and later Death Row Records), the D.O.C. is most remembered for his 1989 debut album No One Can Do It Better featuring the hit single "It's Funky Enough".

Though the Fila Fresh Crew had disbanded by 1988, Dr. Rock launched a solo album of his own in 1991 under the pseudonym Fela Fresh Crew. In 2017, Tuffest Man Alive was released on CD for the first time with a previously released b-side ("I Wanna Know What Love Is") included as a bonus track.

Discography

Extended play

Singles

Guest appearances

Music videos

References

External links
 Fila Fresh Crew discography on Discogs
 Fila Fresh Crew on Werner Von Wallenrod's

American hip hop groups
Rappers from Dallas
Musical groups established in 1987
Musical groups disestablished in 1988
Southern hip hop groups
African-American musical groups
American musical trios
Musical groups from Dallas